Mysmenopsis is a kleptoparasitic genus of tiny tropical and subtropical American spiders in the family Mysmenidae. Most live in the funnelwebs of spiders in the family Dipluridae. M. archeri lives on webs of a species in the family Pholcidae, M. capac and M. cienaga have been observed living in Cyrtophora (Araneidae) webs. One reason why diplurid webs are preferred seems to be that they are persistent in time and space, sometimes spanning several years.

The monotypic genus Isela is closely related.

Mysmenopsis furtiva from Jamaica lives as a kleptoparasite and commensal in webs of Ischnothele xera. It steals portions of its host's prey, but also consumes minute trapped insects that are not sought after by the host. In order not to be recognized, it moves only slowly when the host does not move; else it synchronizes its rapid movements with the movements of the host. M. furtiva has been observed to feed on one end of a prey animal, while the host feeds on the other. When feeding, its legs and pedipalps remain motionless, but its abdomen sways slowly and slightly. One feeding bout can double its abdominal volume. The host shows anti-kleptoparasite behavior, amongst others by adding silk between the kleptoparasite and the feeding site.

The closely related M. furtiva and M. monticola parasitize two spider species that are also closely related, and it is believed that the two groups coevolved.

Species
 it contains fifty-two species, found in the Americas:

 Mysmenopsis alvaroi Dupérré & Tapia, 2020 — Ecuador
 Mysmenopsis amazonica Dupérré & Tapia, 2020 — Ecuador
 Mysmenopsis angamarca Dupérré & Tapia, 2020 — Ecuador
 Mysmenopsis archeri Platnick & Shadab, 1978 — Brazil
 Mysmenopsis atahualpa Baert, 1990 — Peru, Ecuador
 Mysmenopsis awa Dupérré & Tapia, 2020 — Ecuador
 Mysmenopsis baerti Dupérré & Tapia, 2020 — Ecuador
 Mysmenopsis bartolozzii Dupérré & Tapia, 2020 — Ecuador
 Mysmenopsis beebei (Gertsch, 1960) — Trinidad
 Mysmenopsis capac Baert, 1990 — Peru
 Mysmenopsis chiquita Dupérré & Tapia, 2015 — Ecuador
 Mysmenopsis choco Dupérré & Tapia, 2020 — Ecuador
 Mysmenopsis cidrelicola (Simon, 1895) — Venezuela
 Mysmenopsis cienaga Müller, 1987 — Colombia, Peru
 Mysmenopsis corazon Dupérré & Tapia, 2020 — Ecuador
 Mysmenopsis cube Dupérré & Tapia, 2020 — Ecuador
 Mysmenopsis cymbia (Levi, 1956) — USA
 Mysmenopsis dipluramigo Platnick & Shadab, 1978 — Panama, Colombia
 Mysmenopsis femoralis Simon, 1897 — St. Vincent
 Mysmenopsis fernandoi Dupérré & Tapia, 2015 — Ecuador
 Mysmenopsis funebris Simon, 1897 — St. Vincent
 Mysmenopsis furtiva Coyle & Meigs, 1989 — Jamaica
 Mysmenopsis gamboa Platnick & Shadab, 1978 — Panama
 Mysmenopsis guanza Dupérré & Tapia, 2020 — Ecuador
 Mysmenopsis guayaca Dupérré & Tapia, 2020 — Ecuador
 Mysmenopsis huascar Baert, 1990 — Peru
 Mysmenopsis hunachi Dupérré & Tapia, 2020 — Ecuador
 Mysmenopsis ischnamigo Platnick & Shadab, 1978 — Panama, Trinidad, Peru
 Mysmenopsis ixlitla (Levi, 1956) — Mexico
 Mysmenopsis junin Dupérré & Tapia, 2020 — Ecuador
 Mysmenopsis kochalkai Platnick & Shadab, 1978 — Colombia
 Mysmenopsis lasrocas Dupérré & Tapia, 2020 — Ecuador
 Mysmenopsis lloa Dupérré & Tapia, 2020 — Ecuador
 Mysmenopsis mexcala Gertsch, 1960 — Mexico
 Mysmenopsis monticola Coyle & Meigs, 1989 — Jamaica
 Mysmenopsis onorei Dupérré & Tapia, 2015 — Ecuador
 Mysmenopsis otokiki Dupérré & Tapia, 2020 — Ecuador
 Mysmenopsis otonga Dupérré & Tapia, 2015 — Ecuador
 Mysmenopsis pachacutec Baert, 1990 — Peru
 Mysmenopsis palpalis (Kraus, 1955) — Mexico, Guatemala, Honduras
 Mysmenopsis penai Platnick & Shadab, 1978 — Ecuador, Colombia
 Mysmenopsis pululahua Dupérré & Tapia, 2020 — Ecuador
 Mysmenopsis salazarae Dupérré & Tapia, 2020 — Ecuador
 Mysmenopsis schlingeri Platnick & Shadab, 1978 — Peru
 Mysmenopsis shushufindi Dupérré & Tapia, 2020 — Ecuador
 Mysmenopsis tengellacompa Platnick, 1993 — Costa Rica
 Mysmenopsis tepuy Dupérré & Tapia, 2020 — Ecuador
 Mysmenopsis tibialis (Bryant, 1940) — Cuba
 Mysmenopsis tungurahua Dupérré & Tapia, 2020 — Ecuador
 Mysmenopsis viracocha Baert, 1990 — Peru
 Mysmenopsis wygodzinskyi Platnick & Shadab, 1978 — Peru
 Mysmenopsis yupanqui Baert, 1990 — Peru

References

 Chickering, A.M. (1960). The Female of Lucarachne beebei Gertsch (Araneae: Symphytognathidae). Psyche 67:95-97 PDF
 Platnick, N.I. & Shadab, M.U. (1978). A review of the spider genus Mysmenopsis (Araneae, Mysmenidae). American Museum Novitates 2661. PDF - Abstract
 Coyle, F.A. & Meigs, T.E. (1989). Two new species of kleptoparasitic Mysmenopsis (Araneae, Mysmenidae) from Jamaica. Journal of Arachnology 17(1):59-70 PDF
 Coyle, F.A., O'Shields, T.C. & Perlmutter, D.G. (1991). Observations on the behavior of the kleptoparasitic spider, Mysmenopsis furtiva (Araneae, Mysmenidae). Journal of Arachnology 19(1):62-66 PDF

Mysmenidae
Spiders of North America
Spiders of South America
Araneomorphae genera